The 2007 1000 km of Monza was the opening round of the 2007 Le Mans Series season.  It took place on 15 April 2007, at Autodromo Nazionale Monza, Italy.

Official results
Class winners in bold.  Cars failing to complete 70% of winner's distance marked as Not Classified (NC).

Statistics
 Pole Position - #7 Team Peugeot Total - 1:34.503
 Fastest Lap - #8 Team Peugeot Total - 1:36.500
 Average Speed - 200.876 km/h

References

External links
 Le Mans Series - Monza
 World Sports Racing Prototypes - 1000 km of Monza

M
6 Hours of Monza
Monza